Little Children may refer to:
Little Children (novel), by Tom Perrotta
Little Children (film), based on the novel
Little Children (soundtrack), the official soundtrack of the film
"Little Children" (song), a 1964 hit for Billy J. Kramer
 Little Children (album), the album containing it
"Little Children", a song from the eponymous album Brian Wilson